radio2XS was re-branded in 2018 as 2XS Rocks. It is programmed and edited in Sheffield, England and uses the on-air slogan "A.Different.Music.Mix.".

Playing "New Music, Live Sessions and 60 Years of Rock’n'roll", the station was formed in 2002 in Sheffield's Workstation arts and media space by Jeff Cooper, a former DJ and programmer at Hallam FM, Rock FM, Radio Clyde, BBC Radio and others.

The station produces its own live music ('The Barn Sessions', named after the 17th-century Peak District barn where many of them are recorded) and has featured Travis, Idlewild, Cornershop, Alabama 3, Catatonia, Adema, Morcheeba, The Abbots, Johnny Dowd and other bands.

The station is staffed by several veteran English DJs besides Cooper, including Guy Morris, Ed Parnell and Caroline Woodruff. It is fully licensed from the UK by music copyright bodies PPL and MCPS-PRS.

References

External links 
Official website
"5 million and counting at station"; Sheffield Telegraph 
Scarlet Blonde live session 

Radio stations in Yorkshire